The GRTC Pulse (often abbreviated as The Pulse) is a bus rapid transit line in Richmond, Virginia, United States. The line runs along Broad Street and Main Street in central Richmond, between The Shops at Willow Lawn and Rockett's Landing. It opened on June 24, 2018, and is the third bus rapid transit service to be constructed in Virginia. The Pulse is the first regional rapid transit system to serve Richmond since 1949.

The Institute for Transportation and Development Policy (ITDP), under its BRT Standard, has given the Pulse corridor a Bronze ranking.

History 

Before the bus rapid transit system, the city was served by conventional buses operated by the Greater Richmond Transit Company. Bus service in the city began on February 1, 1923, and replaced the city's streetcar system when it ceased operations in 1949. From 1888 until 1949, the city was also served by streetcars via the Richmond Union Passenger Railway.

Original plans for rapid transit in Richmond originated as early as the 1990s, with case studies for light rail and bus rapid transit being studied by the City of Richmond. In 2003, Richmond's Department of Transportation conducted a two-year feasibility study on commuter and light rail in the Greater Richmond Region. The studies found that the lines would be moderately successful, but population in Richmond was not dense enough to demand either said service. Since the studies, other independent groups have begun their own series of studies given Richmond's higher than expected population growth and the region's expected population growth.

In 2010, formal studies began to test the feasibility of a bus rapid transit line, rather than light rail line. The decision to pursue BRT rather than LRT prompted mostly negative reactions from the community, who primarily preferred light rail over bus rapid transit. The Greater Richmond Transit Company has remained open about upgrade the Pulse's initial line to a light rail line in the foreseeable future, should ridership dictate capacity beyond that a BRT system. Feasibility studies, stakeholder analysis, alternative assessments, and environmental impact studies, research was complete in mid-2014.

In late 2014, GRTC unveiled the first set of bus rapid transit plans, which involved several stations stretching from Willow Lawn down to Rocketts Landing. The Main Street Station would serve as the central transportation hub for the Pulse, linking the line with Amtrak, Transdominion Express, Megabus and Central Virginia Express.

On March 17, 2015, GRTC announced that the line would be called the Pulse.

The project team is currently working in the Preliminary Engineering Phase which will be completed by July 31, 2015.  The team is also working to contract with a Construction Manager at Risk (CMAR) construction firm who will work hand-in-hand with architectural designers to finalize the design of the project.  That project delivery method will allow GRTC to begin early construction commitments by June 2016, approximately three to four months prior to design completion.  Construction will last until August 2017. Between September 2017 and October 2017, BRT operations will be tested and accepted. Final BRT operations will begin by October 2017.

The project has an estimated construction cost of $53 million to provide service from Willow Lawn in the west to Rocketts Landing in the east, including fourteen stations and over three miles of dedicated travel lanes. Half of the final design and construction costs come from the federal TIGER grant ($24.9 million). The other half come in the form of a 50% match funded by both state and local sources. The Virginia Department of Rail and Public Transportation (DRPT) will provide 34% ($16.9 million) with the remaining 16% provided by the City of Richmond ($7.6 million) and Henrico County ($400,000). Operation of the service is estimated to cost $2.7 million per year. Some of the operating cost would be covered by fares and the remainder to be provided annually from yet to be determined local funding sources.

In August 2016, construction began on the BRT line with a goal to complete the service by October 2017. The opening was delayed by several months due to difficulty in relocating utility lines at the stations. The Pulse began service on June 24, 2018. The opening ceremony was attended by the Mayor of Richmond, Virginia, Levar Stoney; the Chairperson of the Henrico County Board of Supervisors, Frank Thorton; and the Governor of Virginia, Ralph Northam. Stoney stated that the $65 million project will generate $1 billion in economic activity over the next 20 years, resulting in a $15 return on investment for every dollar invested.

Route 

The Pulse runs along U.S. Route 250 (Broad Street) before shifting south to Main Street downtown via 14th Street. The initial Pulse line links suburban Willow Lawn to Rocketts Landing, both in suburban Henrico, with at least a dozen stations within the city limits of Richmond. During the morning peak, midday, and evening peak on weekdays, buses come to each station every 10 minutes, with off-peak evening and weekend service every 15 minutes and late night service every 30 minutes.

List of stations 

Throughout the course of the project, several station locations have changed, and names of the stations have changed. As of January 17, 2018 this is the current list of stations planned to open along the route.

Schedule 

Buses every 15 minutes (or better) 6:00AM to 9:00 am & 4:00PM to 7:00PM, seven days a week. Up to 30 Minutes of frequency during non peak times. Buses run daily from 6:00AM to 1:00AM the next morning.

Connections 

GRTC Pulse stations will connect to numerous GRTC bus routes, as well as to the Richmond Main Street Station, which will allow for direct access to Amtrak Northeast Regional train service, and Megabus regional bus service. The Scott's Addition station will offer walking distance and bus connection to the Richmond Greyhound bus terminal. Additionally, the Staples Mill station will have connecting bus shuttle service to the Henrico County Government Center and the Richmond Staples Mill Road railway station, which will allow for direct access to Amtrak's Carolinian, Northeast Regional, Palmetto, Silver Meteor and Silver Star train lines.

Incidents 
 On July 10, 2018, a GRTC Pulse bus collided with a pickup truck when it was making a left-hand turn through the dedicated bus lane on West Broad Street, at the intersection of Broad and N Allen Ave.
 On January 5, 2019, a GRTC Pulse bus and an SUV collided along Broad Street. Multiple people were injured.
 On October 8, 2019, a GRTC Pulse bus struck and killed a woman along Broad Street. The driver was also taken to the hospital.
 On May 20, 2020, a driver spun out of control and crashed into a GRTC Pulse bus along East Broad Street. The driver of the car was killed and three passengers on the bus were injured.
 In the late overnight hours of May 29 into May 30, 2020, rioters vandalized and set fire to a GRTC Pulse bus in Downtown Richmond following protests and riots over the murder of George Floyd. There were no passengers or a driver on board at the time. The bus was destroyed in the ensuing protests.

References

External links 
 Map of Proposed Route
 GRTC BRT Transit Page

 
Transportation in Richmond, Virginia
Bus rapid transit in Virginia
2018 establishments in Virginia
Transport infrastructure completed in 2018